Damian Chmiel (born 6 May 1987 in Wadowice) is a Polish professional footballer who plays as a midfielder for Sandecja Nowy Sącz.

Career

Club
In February 2010, he was loaned to Pelikan Łowicz on a half-year deal. He returned to Podbeskidzie in the summer of 2010.

References

External links
 
 

1987 births
Living people
People from Wadowice
Sportspeople from Lesser Poland Voivodeship
Association football midfielders
Polish footballers
Podbeskidzie Bielsko-Biała players
GKS Katowice players
Sandecja Nowy Sącz players
Ekstraklasa players
I liga players
II liga players
III liga players